Camp Sawi is a 2016 Filipino comedy-drama film starring Andi Eigenmann, Bela Padilla, Yassi Pressman, Kim Molina, Sam Milby and Arci Muñoz. It is written and directed by Irene Villamor. It was released on August 24, 2016, by Viva Films.

Plot
Five women, Gwen (Arci Muñoz), Bridgette (Bela Padilla), Jessica (Yassi Pressman), Clarisse (Andi Eigenmann) and Joanne (Kim Molina) enter a boot camp named Camp Sawi. Each woman, had a history of being heartbroken by their romantic interest and the girls as members of the aptly named camp help one another in dealing with their ill feelings under the watch of camp chef and head coach Louie (Sam Milby).

Cast

Main cast
 Bela Padilla as Bridgette "Brij"
 Arci Muñoz as Gwen/Lovejoy
 Andi Eigenmann as Clarisse
 Yassi Pressman as Jessica "Jess"
 Kim Molina as Joan
 Sam Milby as Louie/Camp Master

Supporting cast
 Jerald Napoles
 Sarah Pagcaliwagan
 Cholo Barretto

Special participation
 Dennis Trillo as Chris
 Rico Blanco as Aaron
 Alex Medina as Nelson
 Bret Jackson as Zac
 AJ Muhlach as Randolf
 Tonton Gutierrez as Miguel
Patrick Sugui as Jess' new boyfriend
RJ Padilla as Joan's groom
Regine Tolentino as Jess' mom

Production
Camp Sawi was written and directed by Irene Villamor. The film is a co-production of Viva Films and N2 Productions of Joyce Bernal. A significant portion of the film was shot on Bantayan Island of Cebu province. The film is the first full-length film project for Villamor as a director.

According to Bela Padilla, one of the casts of the film, said that the film's focus is on how women deal with moving on from heartbreak.

Release
Camp Sawi premiered on cinemas nationwide on August 24, 2016, which was dubbed by the production team as "National Sawi Day".

Reception
The Cinema Evaluation Board rated Camp Sawi as a Grade A film.

References

Films shot in Cebu
Films set on beaches
Philippine comedy-drama films
Films directed by Irene Emma Villamor